English Heart is the fifth and final studio album by American recording artist Ronnie Spector, released on April 8, 2016, by 429 Records. The album is a rock and roll record, with Spector covering a variety of classic songs.

Critical reception
Markos Papadatos of Digital Journal praised the album, stating "Overall, Ronnie Spector is as good as ever on her latest studio effort. There are no filler tracks on this musical project, and it proves that the 'Original Bad Girl of Rock and Roll' is back with a vengeance. English Heart garners an A rating."

Track listing

Chart history

Weekly charts

References

2016 albums
429 Records albums